Sagrada Família is a neighborhood in the Eixample district of Barcelona, Catalonia (Spain). Its name comes from the church of the Sagrada Família, work of Antoni Gaudí, which can be found in the center of the neighborhood.

References

Neighbourhoods of Barcelona
Eixample